Rhabdochaeta pluscula is a species of tephritid or fruit flies in the genus Rhabdochaeta of the family Tephritidae.

Distribution
Bismarck Archipelago.

References

Tephritinae
Insects described in 1970
Diptera of Australasia